The Abhisit Cabinet (Council of Ministers) or formally the 59th Council of Ministers (คณะรัฐมนตรี คณะที่ 59) was announced after the appointment of Abhisit Vejjajiva as Prime Minister of Thailand on the 17 December 2008. The Cabinet line-up itself was announced on the 20 December, to the news media. The Cabinet was formally sworn in by His Majesty King Bhumibol Adulyadej on the 22 December at the Klai Kangwon Villa in Hua Hin.

See also
Premiership of Abhisit Vejjajiva

References

 
Cabinets of Thailand